The Second cabinet of Hermann Jónasson was formed 2 April 1938.

Cabinet

Inaugural cabinet

See also 

1938 establishments in Iceland
1939 disestablishments in Iceland
Hermann Jonasson, Second cabinet of
Cabinets established in 1938
Cabinets disestablished in 1939
Progressive Party (Iceland)